Kami Kami Airstrip  is an airstrip serving the small gold mining camp of Kami Kami in the Sipaliwini District of Suriname.

See also

Transport in Suriname
List of airports in Suriname

References

External links
Bing Maps - Kami Kami Airstrip
Google Maps - Kami Kami

Airports in Suriname